Parayanumvayya Parayathirikkanumvayya is a 1985 Indian Malayalam-language crime drama film directed by Priyadarshan and written by Cochin Haneefa. It is a remake of the 1975 Hindi-language film Faraar. The movie starred Mammootty, Shankar, and Menaka. The film was received mixed to negative reviews and average hit .

Plot
Ravi, a convict, escapes from prison to take revenge on the man who ruined his life. He disguises himself and takes shelter at a police officer's house.

Cast
Mammootty as D.S.P Sreenivas
Shankar as Ravi (T. G. Raveendran)
Menaka - Shalini
Sumithra - Sathi
Sreenath - Rajan
Sukumari
Lizy
Cochin Haneefa - Prasad
Kuthiravattam Pappu - Ramettan
KPAC Sunny - Raveendran Nair
Baby Smitha
Mohanlal as Hamsa

Soundtrack
The music was composed by M. G. Radhakrishnan with lyrics by Chunakkara Ramankutty.

References

External links
 

1985 films
1980s Malayalam-language films
Malayalam remakes of Hindi films
Indian action films
Films directed by Priyadarshan
Films scored by M. G. Radhakrishnan
1985 action films